Frederic Raurell i Ges (Barcelona, 1930) is a Catalan Capuchin. He is doctor in theology and graduated in biblical and Semitic studies.

Life

He is founder of the Biblical Association of Catalonia, of the International Organization for the Study of the Old Testament and of the International Organization for Septuagint and Cognate Studies. He collaborated in the Bible of the Catalan Biblical Foundation and in the Comments to the Office of Readings. He is codirector of the review "Estudios Eclesiásticos", where he has published several studies. He was a founder member of the first Editorial Board of Catalan Journal of Theology.

He has also written about Franciscan matters. Lately he has also made some researches about his own family, about Sarrià, and about the time of the Spanish Civil War.

Works

Frederic Raurell has published several articles and books The following ones must be pointed out:

 Ètica de Job i llibertat de Déu. Revista Catalana de Teologia, 4. 1979. 5–24.
 Del text a l’existència (1980). 
 Mots sobre l’home, recopilación de artículos sobre antropología bíblica (1984). 
 Lineamenti di antropologia biblica. Casale Monferrato. 1986. 
 Der Mythos vom männlichen Gott (‘The myth of the masculin God’), inside the feminist theology trend (1989). 
 Os, 4,7. De la "Doxa" a la "Atimia". Revista Catalana de Teologia, 14. 1989. 41–51.
 El Càntic dels Càntis en els segles XII i XIII: la lectura de Clara d'Assís. Barcelona. 1990. 
 I Déu digué.... La paraula feta història. Barcelona. 1995.

References

External links
 Article in the GEC. 

1930 births
Capuchins
20th-century Spanish Roman Catholic theologians
21st-century Spanish Roman Catholic theologians
Living people
Pontifical Universities alumni
Translators of the Bible into Catalan
Bible commentators
Sarrià Capuchins